Lenvervimab (INN; development code GC1102) is a monoclonal antibody that is being investigated for hepatitis B.

This drug is being developed by GC Pharma. , lenvervimab is undergoing Phase II/III trials.

References 

Monoclonal antibodies